Morimus funereus is a species of beetle in family Cerambycidae. It is found in Greece, North Macedonia, Albania, Belgium, Croatia, Slovenia, the Czech Republic, Germany, Hungary, Italy, Moldova, Romania, Bulgaria, Serbia, Montenegro, Slovakia, Ukraine and Bosnia and Herzegovina. It is somewhat similar to another cerambycid, Rosalia alpina, which however is narrower and has three pairs of black spots. Also Herophila tristis has a similar body shape and markings, but the antennal segments 2 and beyond are much shorter.

Some suggest this taxon should be treated as a subspecies of Morimus asper, giving it the scientific name Morimus asper funereus.

Sources

References

External links
 LIFE Rosalia: Morimus funereus

Phrissomini
Taxonomy articles created by Polbot
Beetles described in 1863